Aubrey Cliffs are a series of cliff escarpments located in Coconino County, in northwestern Arizona.

Geology
The Toroweap Fault, west of Aubrey Valley in the south, and of Prospect Valley in the northwest, formed the Aubrey Cliffs. The cliffs form part of the southwest perimeter of the Coconino Plateau. The Toroweap Fault separates from the Hurricane Fault-(Hurricane Cliffs), at the Colorado River, in the western Grand Canyon. Both faults continue northeast, and northwest into southern Utah.

Geography
The Aubrey Cliffs begin near Route 66 about five miles west of Seligman and run generally north to the Colorado River in the Grand Canyon (coordinates ranging from 35.35, -112.95 to 36.19, -113.02). It is located on the Big Boquillas Ranch, a checkerboard area of state trust land and fee land owned by the Navajo Nation.

The northern half overlooks Prospect Valley and is located on the Hualapai Indian Reservation.

Proposed development
The southern cliffs are the site of a proposed 85 megawatt wind farm being developed by the Navajo Nation.

References 

 Aubrey Cliffs – Mountain Zone, Arizona Peaks Entry
 

Cliffs of Arizona
Landforms of Coconino County, Arizona